10258 Sárneczky, provisional designation , is a background asteroid from the outer regions of the asteroid belt, approximately 14 kilometers in diameter. It was discovered on 6 January 1940, by Hungarian astronomer György Kulin at the Konkoly Observatory, near Budapest. The asteroid was named after Hungarian astronomer Krisztián Sárneczky.

Orbit and classification 

Sárneczky is non-family asteroid from the main-belt's background population. It orbits the Sun in the outer asteroid belt at a distance of 2.9–3.5 AU once every 5 years and 7 months (2,053 days). Its orbit has an eccentricity of 0.09 and an inclination of 14° with respect to the ecliptic. The body's observation arc begins with its official discovery observation at Konkoly in 1940.

Physical characteristics

Diameter and albedo 

According to the survey carried out by the NEOWISE mission of NASA's Wide-field Infrared Survey Explorer, Sárneczky measures 14.275 kilometers in diameter  and its surface has an albedo of 0.151. The asteroid has an absolute magnitude of 12.1.

Rotation period 

As of 2017, no rotational lightcurve of Sárneczky has been obtained from photometric observations. The body's rotation period, shape and poles remain unknown.

Naming 

This minor planet was named after Krisztián Sárneczky (born 1974), a Hungarian amateur astronomer and discoverer of minor planets and supernovae. He is a board member of the Hungarian Astronomical Association (HAA). The official naming citation was published by the Minor Planet Center on 5 October 2017.

References

External links 
 Asteroid Lightcurve Database (LCDB), query form (info )
 Dictionary of Minor Planet Names, Google books
 Asteroids and comets rotation curves, CdR – Observatoire de Genève, Raoul Behrend
 Discovery Circumstances: Numbered Minor Planets (10001)-(15000) – Minor Planet Center
 

010258
Discoveries by György Kulin
Named minor planets
19400106